 
Edward W. Hathaway (July 9, 1839 – April 6, 1916) was a Union Navy sailor in the American Civil War who received the U.S. military's highest decoration, the Medal of Honor.

Born on July 9, 1839, in Plymouth, Massachusetts, Hathaway was still living in that city when he joined the Navy. On June 28, 1862, Sciota was heading down the Mississippi River to participate in an attack on Vicksburg when it came under heavy fire. Hathaway "displayed exceptional courage" after being severely wounded. For this action, he was awarded the Medal of Honor five years later on October 3, 1867.

Hathaway's official Medal of Honor citation reads:
On board the U.S.S. Sciota prior to the battle Vicksburg, on 28 June 1862. Struck by a bullet which severed his left arm above the elbow, Hathaway displayed exceptional courage as his ship sustained numerous damaging hits from stem to stern while proceeding down the river to fight the battle of Vicksburg.

Hathaway died on April 6, 1916, at age {{#expr:(1916)-(1839)-((4)<(7)or(4)=(7)and(6)<(9))}} and was buried in Everett, Massachusetts.

See also

Siege of Vicksburg

Notes

References

External links
 
 Naval History and Heritage Command: USS Sciota I (ScGbt) - "90-day Gunboat" 1861

1839 births
1916 deaths
People from Plymouth, Massachusetts
People of Massachusetts in the American Civil War
Union Navy sailors
United States Navy Medal of Honor recipients
American Civil War recipients of the Medal of Honor